The 1963 New York state election was held on November 5, 1963, to elect a judge of the New York Court of Appeals. Besides, an amendment to the State Constitution proposed to allow off-track betting and was accepted.

Background
Judge Sydney F. Foster would reach the constitutional age limit of 70 years at the end of the year.

Nominations
Both Democratic and the Republican state committees met on September 9, and nominated Democrat Francis Bergan, the Presiding Justice of the Appellate Division (Third Dept.), to succeed Foster.

The Liberal State Committee met on September 10, and endorsed the Democratic/Republican nominee.

Result
Francis Bergan was elected unopposed.

Notes

Sources
VOTE LIGHT HERE; ...Amendments Pass; Off-Track Betting Proposal Is Approved by a Margin of 3 to 1 in Light City Voting in NYT on November 6, 1963 (subscription required)

See also
New York state elections

1963
 
New York